This is a list of 300 species in the genus Hoplia, monkey beetles.

Hoplia species

 Hoplia advena Brenske, 1894 c g
 Hoplia africana Escalera, 1914 c g
 Hoplia albisparsa Bates, 1887 c g
 Hoplia albomaculata Moser, 1912 c g
 Hoplia amoena Brenske, 1900 c g
 Hoplia anatolica Reitter, 1890 c g
 Hoplia angulata Reitter, 1902 c g
 Hoplia argentata Nonfried, 1891 c g
 Hoplia argentea (Poda, 1761) c g
 Hoplia argenteola Moser, 1921 c g
 Hoplia argyritis Bates, 1887 c g
 Hoplia asperula Bates, 1887 c g
 Hoplia asteria Reitter, 1901 c g
 Hoplia attilioi Massa, 1979 c g
 Hoplia aulica (Linnaeus, 1767) c g
 Hoplia aurantiaca Waterhouse, 1877 c g
 Hoplia aurata Waterhouse, 1877 c g
 Hoplia aureola (Pallas, 1781) c g
 Hoplia aurifera Brenske, 1893 c g
 Hoplia auromicans Brenske, 1893 c g
 Hoplia aurotincta Fairmaire, 1888 c g
 Hoplia bakeri Moser, 1921 c g
 Hoplia bezdeki Keith, 2002 c g
 Hoplia bilineata (Fabricius, 1801) c g
 Hoplia biplagiata Moser, 1917 c g
 Hoplia bisignata Gyllenhal, 1817 c g
 Hoplia bomiensis Zeng, 1986 c g
 Hoplia borneensis Moser, 1912 c g
 Hoplia bowringi Waterhouse, 1877 c g
 Hoplia bracteata Prokofiev, 2015 c g
 Hoplia brastagiensis Moser, 1924 c g
 Hoplia breviceps Moser, 1918 c g
 Hoplia brevipes Medvedev, 1952 c g
 Hoplia brevis Nonfried, 1895 c g
 Hoplia bruchoides Fairmaire, 1903 c g
 Hoplia brunnipes Bonelli, 1807 c g
 Hoplia bucharica Reitter, 1898 c g
 Hoplia caffra Burmeister, 1855 c g
 Hoplia callipyge LeConte, 1856 i c g b
 Hoplia caucasica Kolenati, 1846 c g
 Hoplia chinensis Endrödi, 1952 c g
 Hoplia chlorophana Erichson, 1848 c g
 Hoplia choui Miyake, 1986 c g
 Hoplia ciliata Castelnau, 1840 c g
 Hoplia cincticollis (Faldermann, 1833) c g
 Hoplia cinereonebulosa Nonfried, 1895 i c g
 Hoplia ciscaucasica Medvedev, 1952 c g
 Hoplia citrea Endrödi, 1952 c g
 Hoplia citrinella Fairmaire, 1887 c g
 Hoplia clotildae Sabatinelli, 1983 c g
 Hoplia coerulea (Drury, 1773) c g
 Hoplia coeruleosignata Moser, 1916 c g
 Hoplia coffeae Arrow, 1925 c g
 Hoplia colchica Petrovitz, 1967 c g
 Hoplia colini Moser, 1918 c g
 Hoplia coluzzi Sabatinelli, 1983 c g
 Hoplia communis Waterhouse, 1875 c g
 Hoplia concolor Sharp, 1878 c g
 Hoplia convexicollis Moser, 1912 c g
 Hoplia coralipes Reitter, 1883 c g
 Hoplia corniculata Reitter, 1890 c g
 Hoplia corporaali Moser, 1924 c g
 Hoplia cretacea Bates, 1887 c g
 Hoplia cupulosa Peyerimhoff, 1939 c g
 Hoplia cyanosignata Miyake, 1994 c g
 Hoplia cylindrica Reitter, 1903 c g
 Hoplia dalatella (Prokofiev, 2012) c g
 Hoplia davidis Fairmaire, 1887 c g
 Hoplia detrita Solsky, 1876 c g
 Hoplia diana Sharp, 1876 c g
 Hoplia digitifera Peyerimhoff, 1939 c g
 Hoplia dilutipes Reitter, 1890 c g
 Hoplia dispar LeConte, 1880 i c g b
 Hoplia disparilis Bates, 1887 c g
 Hoplia dissexualis Prokofiev, 2015 c g
 Hoplia divina Endrödi, 1953 c g
 Hoplia djukini Jacobson, 1914 c g
 Hoplia dombrovskii Nonfried, 1895 c g
 Hoplia dubia (Rossi, 1790) c
 Hoplia elegantula White, 1844 c g
 Hoplia elongata Quedenfeldt, 1888 c g
 Hoplia endroedii Balthasar, 1955 c g
 Hoplia equina LeConte, 1880 i c g
 Hoplia errata Fairmaire, 1898 c g
 Hoplia ertli Moser, 1919 c g
 Hoplia euphratica Zaitzev, 1923 c g
 Hoplia excellens Endrödi, 1952 c g
 Hoplia festiva Burmeister, 1844 c g
 Hoplia fiorii Fracassi, 1906 c g
 Hoplia fissa Reitter, 1890 g
 Hoplia fissipes Moser, 1912 c g
 Hoplia flavipes Germar, 1824 c g
 Hoplia flavomaculata Moser, 1912 c g
 Hoplia floridana Fisher, 1918 i c g
 Hoplia forsteri Tesar, 1969 c g
 Hoplia freudei Tesar, 1969 c g
 Hoplia freyi Baraud, 1967 c g
 Hoplia fukiensis Endrödi, 1952 c g
 Hoplia fulgida Waterhouse, 1877 c g
 Hoplia fuliginosa Nonfried, 1894 c g
 Hoplia fulvipennis Moser, 1912 c g
 Hoplia fulvofemorata Moser, 1912 c g
 Hoplia fungifera Prokofiev, 2015 c g
 Hoplia gabonica Moser, 1918 c g
 Hoplia gibbicollis Arrow, 1941 c g
 Hoplia gilleti Hardy, 1977 i c g
 Hoplia golovjankoi Jacobson, 1914 c g
 Hoplia gracilis Endrödi, 1952 c g
 Hoplia graminicola (Fabricius, 1792) c g
 Hoplia grisea Moser, 1912 c g
 Hoplia griseonebulosa Moser, 1921 c g
 Hoplia griseosparsa Moser, 1921 c g
 Hoplia griseosquamosa Moser, 1918 c g
 Hoplia griseovestita Moser, 1924 c g
 Hoplia guatemalensis Bates, 1887 c g
 Hoplia gyirongensis Zeng, 1986 c g
 Hoplia hakonensis Sawada, 1938 c g
 Hoplia hauseri Reitter, 1904 c g
 Hoplia hayashii Miyake, 1986 c g
 Hoplia herminiana Apfelbeck, 1908 c g
 Hoplia heterolepis Prokofiev, 2015 c g
 Hoplia hirsuta Moser, 1912 c g
 Hoplia hirta LeConte, 1880 i c g
 Hoplia hirticollis Heyden, 1889 c g
 Hoplia hofmanni Nonfried, 1895 c g
 Hoplia horrida Moser, 1918 c g
 Hoplia huettenbacheri (Nonfried, 1891) c g
 Hoplia hungarica Burmeister, 1844 c g
 Hoplia hyrcana Medvedev, 1952 c g
 Hoplia imitatrix Nonfried, 1895 c g
 Hoplia imparilis Moser, 1912 c g
 Hoplia indica Moser, 1912 c g
 Hoplia ingrata Fairmaire, 1888 c g
 Hoplia inops Bates, 1887 c g
 Hoplia inornata Kobayashi, 1990 c g
 Hoplia iridescens Zeng, 1986 c g
 Hoplia jacobsoni Reitter, 1903 c g
 Hoplia jalapana Moser, 1918 c g
 Hoplia javana Moser, 1912 c g
 Hoplia kamerunica Moser, 1918 c g
 Hoplia klapperichi Endrödi, 1952 c g
 Hoplia korbi Petrovitz, 1958 c g
 Hoplia koreana Moser, 1920 c g
 Hoplia kunzii Schmidt, 1840 c g
 Hoplia laconiae Petrovitz, 1958 c g
 Hoplia laetitiae Sabatinelli, 1983 c g
 Hoplia lama Endrödi, 1952 c g
 Hoplia langbianella Prokofiev, 2015 c g
 Hoplia lao Prokofiev, 2015 c g
 Hoplia latesutulata (Fairmaire, 1899) g
 Hoplia latesuturata (Fairmaire, 1900) c g
 Hoplia laticollis LeConte, 1856 i c g b
 Hoplia leytensis Kobayashi & Fujioka, 2014 c g
 Hoplia limbata LeConte, 1856 c g
 Hoplia lindiana Moser, 1918 c g
 Hoplia lineata Moser, 1921 c g
 Hoplia lishana Miyake, 1986 c g
 Hoplia lurida Moser, 1918 c g
 Hoplia luzonica Moser, 1924 c g
 Hoplia maculifera Moser, 1910 c g
 Hoplia magnifica Arrow, 1932 c g
 Hoplia mahayana Sabatinelli, 1983 c g
 Hoplia malaccensis Moser, 1912 c g
 Hoplia malaisei Arrow, 1946 c g
 Hoplia manowensis Moser, 1918 c g
 Hoplia maremmana (Leo, Liberto, Rattu & Sechi, 2010) c g
 Hoplia mausonensis Moser, 1921 c g
 Hoplia medana Moser, 1912 c g
 Hoplia mediocris Fairmaire, 1887 c g
 Hoplia meridiana  g
 Hoplia messapia  g
 Hoplia mexicana Harold, 1869 c g
 Hoplia mina Jacobson, 1914 c g
 Hoplia mindoroensis Kobayashi & Fujioka, 2014 c g
 Hoplia minuscula Fairmaire, 1889 c g
 Hoplia minuta (Panzer, 1789) c g
 Hoplia modesta Haldeman, 1843 i c g b
 Hoplia moerens Waterhouse, 1875 c g
 Hoplia montana Moser, 1921 c g
 Hoplia monticola Miyake, 1986 c g
 Hoplia moultoni Moser, 1912 c g
 Hoplia mucorea (Germar, 1824) i c g b
 Hoplia mulleri Nonfried, 1895 c g
 Hoplia nakanei Miyake, 1986 c g
 Hoplia nebulosa Fairmaire, 1889 c g
 Hoplia negrosensis Kobayashi & Fujioka, 2014 c g
 Hoplia nengkaoshana Miyake, 1986 c g
 Hoplia nepalensis Tesar, 1969 c g
 Hoplia nhatrangella Prokofiev, 2015 c g
 Hoplia niasana Moser, 1912 c g
 Hoplia nigrina Reitter, 1885 c g
 Hoplia nigromaculata Moser, 1912 c g
 Hoplia nigrosetosa Miyake, 1994 c g
 Hoplia nigrosparsa Moser, 1921 c g
 Hoplia nitidipunctata Arrow, 1941 c g
 Hoplia oblonga Gyllenhal, 1817 c g
 Hoplia ochracea Burmeister, 1844 c g
 Hoplia ochraceoscutellata Moser, 1921 c g
 Hoplia ochreata Fairmaire, 1889 c g
 Hoplia opalescens Fairmaire, 1893 c g
 Hoplia paganettii Müller, 1907 c g
 Hoplia parvula Krynicky, 1832 c g
 Hoplia paupera Krynicky, 1832 c g
 Hoplia pentheri Ganglbauer, 1906 c g
 Hoplia peroni Blanchard, 1850 c g
 Hoplia philanthus (Fuessly, 1775) c g
 Hoplia philippinensis Moser, 1910 c g
 Hoplia pilifera Desbrochers des Loges, 1869 c g
 Hoplia pisicolor Burmeister, 1844 c g
 Hoplia platyca Zeng, 1986 c g
 Hoplia plebeja Moser, 1921 c g
 Hoplia polita Bates, 1891 c g
 Hoplia pollinosa Krynicky, 1832 c g
 Hoplia pontica Petrovitz, 1967 c g
 Hoplia potanini Heyden, 1889 c g
 Hoplia prasina Arrow, 1941 c g
 Hoplia praticola Duftschmidt, 1805 c g
 Hoplia pseudophilanthus Petrovitz, 1967 c g
 Hoplia psilocephala Prokofiev, 2015 c g
 Hoplia pubicollis Küster, 1849 c g
 Hoplia pulchella Moser, 1912 c g
 Hoplia pulchra Miyake, 1986 c g
 Hoplia puncticollis Gebler, 1832 c g
 Hoplia quasiplebeja Prokofiev, 2015 c g
 Hoplia reinii Heyden, 1878 c g
 Hoplia reitteri Von Dalle Torre, 1912 c g
 Hoplia rossica Medvedev, 1952 c g
 Hoplia rotunda Bates, 1887 c g
 Hoplia rufocuprea Medvedev, 1952 c g
 Hoplia rufopicta Fairmaire, 1889 c g
 Hoplia rungsi Kocher, 1957 c g
 Hoplia rutilapta Prokofiev, 2015 c g
 Hoplia sabatinellii Rey, 2006 c g
 Hoplia sabraechatilae Sabatinelli, 1983 c g
 Hoplia sackenii LeConte, 1880 i c g b
 Hoplia salaama Brenske, 1898 c g
 Hoplia scheibei Balthasar, 1936 c g
 Hoplia scheini Endrödi, 1953 c g
 Hoplia schuberti Petrovitz, 1962 c g
 Hoplia schultheissi Nonfried, 1894 c g
 Hoplia scutellaris Waterhouse, 1877 c g
 Hoplia semenowi Heyden, 1889 c g
 Hoplia semicastanea Fairmaire, 1887 c g
 Hoplia setifera Moser, 1912 c g
 Hoplia setosella Brenske, 1893 c g
 Hoplia shibatai  g
 Hoplia shimomurai Kobayashi, 1990 c g
 Hoplia shirakii Nomura, 1959 c g
 Hoplia shirozui Kobayashi, 1990 c g
 Hoplia sibuyana Moser, 1924 c g
 Hoplia signata Moser, 1912 c g
 Hoplia simillima Miyake, 1986 c g
 Hoplia simplex Sharp, 1876 c g
 Hoplia siningensis Frivaldszky, 1892 c g
 Hoplia sobrina Sharp, 1876 c g
 Hoplia sordida Burmeister, 1844 c g
 Hoplia spectabilis Medvedev, 1952 c g
 Hoplia squamacea White, 1844 c g
 Hoplia squamifera Burmeister, 1844 c g
 Hoplia squamiventris Burmeister, 1855 c g
 Hoplia stenolepis Apfelbeck, 1908 c g
 Hoplia striatipennis Wickham, 1914 c g
 Hoplia subcostata Bates, 1887 c g
 Hoplia sulcicollis Moser, 1912 c g
 Hoplia surata Bates, 1887 c g
 Hoplia susiana Escalera, 1913 c g
 Hoplia taipeiensis Kobayashi & Chou, 2008 c g
 Hoplia taiwana Miyake, 1986 c g
 Hoplia taliensis Moser, 1921 c g
 Hoplia tangana Moser, 1924 c g
 Hoplia teapensis Bates, 1887 c g
 Hoplia tenebrosa Nonfried, 1895 c g
 Hoplia tesari Sabatinelli, 1983 c g
 Hoplia testudinis Sabatinelli, 1997 c g
 Hoplia thibetana Von Dalle Torre, 1912 c g
 Hoplia trifasciata Say, 1825 i c g b  (three lined hoplia)
 Hoplia trivialis Harold, 1869 i c g b  (dark hoplia)
 Hoplia tuberculicollis Moser, 1912 c g
 Hoplia tuberculifera Moser, 1924 c g
 Hoplia uniformis Reitter, 1885 c g
 Hoplia usambarica Moser, 1918 c g
 Hoplia ushijima Kobayashi, 1990 c g
 Hoplia ushijimai Kobayashi, 1990 g
 Hoplia validipes Fairmaire, 1889 c g
 Hoplia variabilis Kobayashi & Fujioka, 2014 c g
 Hoplia ventraerata Prokofiev, 2015 c g
 Hoplia ventricosa Brenske, 1893 c g
 Hoplia versicolor Moser, 1921 c g
 Hoplia vestita Boheman, 1858 c g
 Hoplia vicina Frivaldszky, 1890 c g
 Hoplia vidua Moser, 1918 c g
 Hoplia virginioi Sabatinelli, 1983 c g
 Hoplia viridisignata Moser, 1912 c g
 Hoplia viridissima Brenske, 1894 c g
 Hoplia viridula Brenske, 1899 c g
 Hoplia vittata Nonfried, 1895 c g
 Hoplia walterrossii Sabatinelli, 1992 c g
 Hoplia waterstradti Moser, 1912 c g
 Hoplia zaitzevi Jacobson, 1914 c g
 Hoplia zaragozai Carillo-Ruiz, 2011 c g

dark hoplia
Data sources: i = ITIS, c = Catalogue of Life, g = GBIF, b = Bugguide.net

References

Hoplia